A fashion icon or fashion leader is a influential person who introduces new styles which spread throughout fashion culture and become part of fashion. They initiate a new style which others may follow. They may be famous personalities such as political leaders, celebrities, or sports personalities. For example, during the 1960s, Jackie Kennedy was a great fashion icon for American women, and her style became a sign of wealth, power, and distinction; and her famous Pink Chanel suit is one of the most referenced and revisited of all of her items of clothing. Twiggy was an It girl, she was a teenaged model and fashion icon of Swinging Sixties.

Fashion leaders 
"Fashion leaders" are an older term replaced in the second half of the 20th century. Fashion leaders were important people of higher hierarchy and society such as royalty, aristocrats and their wives and mistresses.

 Empress Joséphine, the first wife of Emperor Napoleon I was herself holding the ''Empire dress line.''
 Beau Brummell,  a friend of the King George IV was a fashion leader in men's fashion.
 Nur Jahan, the Mughal emperor Jahangir was a fashion enthusiast, and she was having a great interest in clothing items of that time; she set many fashion trends. Nur Jahan was very creative and had a good fashion sense, and she is credited for many textile materials and dresses like nurmahali dress and fine cloths like Panchtoliya badla (silver-threaded brocade), kinari'' (silver-threaded lace), etc.
Diana, Princess of Wales was a fashion leader in the 1980s and 1990s.

Other style icons 
Mary Quant was a famous fashion designer and fashion icon of the 1960s who introduced mini skirt, She is also attributed for hotpants, the slip dress, and  PVC raincoats.
Audrey Hepburn (see, Fashion of Audrey Hepburn)
Diana, Princess of Wales (see, Fashion of Diana, Princess of Wales)
Madonna (see, Fashion of Madonna)

Political leaders 
Following politicians are fashion icons too.

 Narendra Modi is a fashion icon for half-sleeved Kurtas.

Power dressing

Power dressing a clothing style that enables women to establish their authority and power in the traditionally male dominated profession such as politics. Margaret Thatcher's style sets the rules on how female politicians should dress, which is a conservative, powerful but simultaneously feminine way.
 Margaret Thatcher was the  one of the first to incorporate the spirit of power suits.
 Angela Merkel popularized the use of trouser suits or pantsuits.

Dresses
Similar to the Little Black Dress that is associated with actress Audrey Hepburn. the following dresses and garments are famous with the names of fashion icons.
 Eugénie hat, the original Eugénie hat was named after Eugénie de Montijo, wife of Napoleon III, whose fashion choices were publicized in fashion sketches and closely scrutinized across Europe and the United States.
 Pink Chanel suit of Jacqueline Bouvier Kennedy
 Black Givenchy dress of Audrey Hepburn
 White dress of Marilyn Monroe
 Marilyn Monroe's pink dress
 Black dress of Rita Hayworth

Quotes

See also 

 Model (person), a person with a role either to promote, display or advertise commercial products (notably fashion clothing in fashion shows) or to serve as a visual aid for people who are creating works of art or to pose for photography. 
Cultural icon, a person or an artifact that is identified by members of a culture as representative of that culture. 
Fashion journalism

Citations 

Fashion
Human appearance